This is a list of former and current New York Times employees, reporters, and columnists.

Current

Publisher
 A. G. Sulzberger (2018–present)

Masthead
List of masthead employees as of August 2022:

News
 Joseph Kahn, executive editor
 Marc Lacey, managing editor
 Carolyn Ryan, managing editor
 Rebecca Blumenstein, deputy managing editor
 Sam Dolnick, deputy managing editor
 Steve Duenes, deputy managing editor
 Clifford J. Levy, deputy managing editor
 Elisabeth Bumiller, assistant managing editor
 Monica Drake, assistant managing editor
 Matthew Ericson, assistant managing editor
 Hannah Poferl, assistant managing editor
 Sam Sifton, assistant managing editor
 Karen Skog, assistant managing editor
 Michael Slackman, assistant managing editor

Opinion
 Kathleen Kingsbury, opinion page editor
 Patrick Healy, deputy opinion editor

Business
 Meredith Kopit Levien, chief executive officer
 Diane Brayton, general counsel and secretary
 Roland A. Caputo, chief financial officer
 Jacqueline Welch, chief human resources officer
 William T. Bardeen, chief strategy officer
 R. Anthony Benten, chief accounting officer, treasurer
 Alexandra Hardiman, chief product officer
 Lisa Ryan Howard, head of advertising
 David Perpich, publisher of The Athletic and Wirecutter
 Dave Rubin, chief marketing and communications officer
 Jason Sobel, chief technology officer
 Hannah Yang, chief growth officer

Department heads

 Jia Lynn Yang, national editor
 Greg Winter, international managing editor
 Randy Archibold, sports editor
 Ellen Pollock, business editor
 Nestor Ramos, metro editor
 David Halbfinger, politics editor
 Stella Bugbee, Styles editor
Sia Michel, deputy culture editor
Andrew LaVallee, arts and leisure editor
Bill McDonald, obituaries editor
Will Shortz, crossword puzzle editor
Jake Silverstein, editor, The New York Times Magazine
Gilbert Cruz, editor, The New York Times Book Review
Hanya Yanagihara, editor, T: The New York Times Style Magazine
Kevin Quealy, editor The Upshot

Bureau chiefs

Domestic bureaus
Richard Fausset, Atlanta
Ellen Barry, Boston
Julie Bosman, Chicago
Jack Healy, Denver
Manny Fernandez, Houston
Adam Nagourney, Los Angeles
Patricia Mazzei, Miami
Frances Robles, Miami/Caribbean
Rick Rojas, Nashville
Campbell Robertson, New Orleans
Thomas Fuller, San Francisco
Kirk Johnson, Seattle
Elisabeth Bumiller, Washington

Foreign bureaus
 Thomas Erdbrink, Amsterdam
 Sui-Lee Wee, Bangkok
 Jane Arraf, Baghdad
 Steven Lee Myers, Beijing
 Anne Barnard, Beirut
 Katrin Bennhold, Berlin
 Declan Walsh, Cairo
 Nicholas Casey, Madrid
 Dionne Searcey, Dakar
 Tim Arango, Istanbul
 Patrick Kingsley, Jerusalem
 John Eligon, Johannesburg
 Rod Nordland, Kabul
 Steven Erlanger, London (chief diplomatic correspondent) 
 Mark Landler, London 

Foreign bureaus (cont.)
 Nicholas Casey, Madrid
 Maria Abi-Habib, Mexico City
 Anton Troianovski, Moscow
 Mujib Mashal, New Delhi
 Ian Austen, Ottawa
 Roger Cohen, Paris
 Jack Nicas, Rio de Janeiro
 Jason Horowitz, Rome
 Keith Bradsher, Shanghai
 Damien Cave, Sydney
 Motoko Rich, Tokyo
 Catherine Porter, Toronto
 Somini Sengupta, United Nations
 Andrew Higgins, Warsaw

Op-ed columnists
Opinion columnists as of August 2022:

Charles M. Blow
Jamelle Bouie
David Brooks
Frank Bruni
Gail Collins
Ross Douthat
Maureen Dowd
David French
Thomas Friedman
Michelle Goldberg
Ezra Klein
Paul Krugman
Farhad Manjoo
Tressie McMillan Cottom
Pamela Paul
Bret Stephens
Zeynep Tufekci

Other personnel

 Eric Asimov, chief wine critic
 Peter Baker, chief White House correspondent
 Jo Becker, investigative reporter
 Walt Bogdanich, investigative reporter
 Ben Brantley, theater critic
 Ben Casselman, economics reporter
 Manohla Dargis, film critic
Jim Dwyer, "About New York" columnist
 Thomas Feyer, letters editor
 Michael R. Gordon, chief military correspondent, winner of George Polk Award

 Maggie Haberman, White House reporter

 Stephen Holden, film critic

 Lara Jakes, diplomatic correspondent
 George Johnson, science reporter
 Dwight Garner, book critic
 Michiko Kakutani, book reviewer
 Christine Kay, enterprise consultant
 Florence Finch Kelly, book reviewer
 Kate Kelly Washington bureau correspondent
 Michael Kimmelman, architecture critic
 John Leland, popular culture, national
 David Leonhardt, senior writer
 Mark Mazzetti, National security correspondent
 Dennis Overbye, former deputy science editor, currently a science reporter
 Philip P. Pan, Asia editor
 Jon Pareles, pop music critic
 Bill Pennington, "On Par" columnist and sports reporter
 James Risen, national security correspondent
 Michael Rothfeld, investigative reporter
 David E. Sanger, Washington correspondent
 Charlie Savage, legal affairs correspondent
 A. O. Scott, film critic
 Robert B. Semple Jr., associate editor, Times editorial page, Pulitzer Prize winner
 Scott Shane, national security correspondent
 Andrew Ross Sorkin, chief mergers & acquisitions correspondent
 Sheryl Gay Stolberg, Washington correspondent, covering health policy
 Neil Strauss, freelance music writer
 Marc Tracy, journalist on the Culture desk
 Anthony Tommasini, chief music critic
 David C. Unger, foreign affairs editorial writer
 Pete Wells, restaurant critic
 Chris Wiggins, chief data scientist
 Damon Winter, Pulitzer Prize-winning staff photographer
 Sheryl WuDunn, industry and international business editor and Pulitzer Prize winner

 Rory Smith, chief soccer correspondent

Former

Publishers
George Jones (1851-1891)
George F. Spinney (1893-1896)
Adolph Ochs (1896-1935)
Arthur Hays Sulzberger (1935-1961)
Orvil Dryfoos (1961-1963)
Arthur Ochs "Punch" Sulzberger (1963-1992)
Arthur Ochs Sulzberger Jr. (1992-2017)

Editors in chief
Henry Jarvis Raymond (1851-1869)
Charles Ransom Miller (1883-1922)

Executive editors
(position created in 1964 superseding managing editor as top news official)
Turner Catledge (1964–1968)
James Reston (1968–1969)
position vacant (1969–1976)
A. M. Rosenthal (1977–1986)
Max Frankel (1986–1994)
Joseph Lelyveld (1994–2001) and briefly in 2003
Howell Raines (2001–2003)
 Bill Keller (2003–2011)
 Jill Abramson (2011–2014)
 Dean Baquet (2014–2022)
 Joseph Kahn (2022–)

Managing editors
George F. Spinney (1889-1893)

Carr Van Anda (1904-1932)
Edwin Leland James (1932-1951)
Turner Catledge (1952-1964)
Clifton Daniel (1964-1969)
A. M. Rosenthal (1969-1977)
Seymour Topping (1977-1986)
Arthur Gelb (1986-1989)
Joseph Lelyveld (1990-1994)
Gene Roberts (1994-1997)

Editorial page editors
Titled Editor-in-Chief or Editor until retirement of Merz but never had authority over news pages.
Rollo Ogden (1922-1937)
John Huston Finley (1937-1938)
Charles Merz (1938-1961)
John Bertram Oakes (1961-1976)
Max Frankel (1977-1986)
Jack Rosenthal (journalist) (1986-1993)
Howell Raines (1993-2001)
Gail Collins (2001-2006)
Andrew Rosenthal (2007-2016)

Other former personnel
 Brooks Atkinson, theater critic
 Matt Bai, news analyst and "Political Times" columnist
 Clive Barnes, dance and theater critic
 Jayson Blair, reporter (1999–2003); resigned over plagiarism and fabrications
 Raymond Bonner, civil war reporter in El Salvador; resigned in protest
 Don Hogan Charles, photographer
 Adam Clymer, former correspondent in Washington, D.C.
 William G. Connolly, co-author of The New York Times Manual of Style and Usage
 Bill Cunningham, fashion photographer
 Kurt Eichenwald, business reporter
 Janet Elder, deputy managing editor (died 2017)
 James M. Follo, chief financial officer (2007-2018)
 Leonard P. Forman, chief financial officer (2001-2007)
 Vanessa Friedman, fashion critic
 Linda Greenhouse, U.S. Supreme Court correspondent, Pulitzer Prize winner
 Trish Hall, masthead editor overseeing six feature sections (2010–2011), op-ed editor (2011–2015), and senior editor (2015–2017)
 Bernard Holland, music critic (1981–1994), chief music critic (1995–2008)
 Cathy Horyn, fashion critic (1998–2014) 
 Sarah Jeong, Editorial Board
 Walter Kerr, theater critic
 Anna Kisselgoff, dance critic from 1968, chief dance critic (1977-2005)
 Arthur Krock, Pulitzer Prize winning correspondent and columnist
 Trymaine Lee, Harlem beat reporter (2006–2011)
 Christopher Lehmann-Haupt, book reviewer
 Eric Lichtblau, legal affairs reporter
 Hugo Lindgren, editor, The New York Times Magazine (2010–2013)
Robert Lipsyte, sports journalist
Herbert Matthews, reporter, known for interviewing Fidel Castro in his Sierra Maestra hideout
 Judith Miller, reporter, jailed for refusing to reveal sources
Gretchen Morgenson, business reporter and winner of Pulitzer Prize
Stuart E. Nassauer, senior copy editor (1949-1986); editor of Kennedy assassination news and other historical events
 Rajiv Pant, chief technology officer (2011-2015)
 Patricia Peterson, fashion editor, 1957-1977
 Dith Pran, photojournalist during Cambodian war
 Saskia de Rothschild, former reporter for the International New York Times
 Harrison Salisbury, Pulitzer Prize and George Polk Award winner 
 William E. Sauro, staff photographer. Won George Polk Award 1965.
 Sydney Schanberg, Pulitzer Prize and George Polk Award winner; resigned in protest.
 Harry Schwartz, former editorial board writer
 Allan M. Siegal, co-author of The New York Times Manual of Style and Usage
 Louis Silverstein, design director
 Alison Smale, former Berlin bureau chief
Craig S. Smith, former Shanghai bureau chief and founder of The New York Times'''  Chinese website
 Hedrick Smith, correspondent and bureau chief
 Barbara Strauch, editor (2000–2015)
 Walter Sullivan, science editor
 John Swinton, chief editorialist (1860–1869)
 Fred D. Thompson, former vice president for advertising
 Howard Thompson, film critic
 Robin Toner, first women national political correspondent
 Don Van Natta Jr., Pulitzer Prize winning investigative correspondent
 Ivan Veit, former executive vice president 
 Sean Villafranca, design manager (1998–2008)
 Betsy Wade, copy editor (1956–2001)
Bari Weiss, op-ed staff editor (2017–2020)
 Alden Whitman, chief obituary writer (1964-1976)
Carey Winfrey, local and foreign correspondent

Public editors
The public editor position was established in 2003 in response to the Jayson Blair scandal. In late May 2017, The New York Times'' announced that it was eliminating the post. Arthur Ochs Sulzberger Jr. announced: "The public editor position, created in the aftermath of a grave journalistic scandal, played a crucial part in rebuilding our readers’ trusts by acting as our in-house watchdog. We welcomed that criticism, even when it stung. But today, our followers on social media and our readers across the internet have come together to collectively serve as a modern watchdog, more vigilant and forceful than one person could ever be."
 Daniel Okrent (2003–2005) 
 Byron Calame (2005–2007)
 Clark Hoyt (2007–2010)
 Arthur S. Brisbane (2010–2012)
 Margaret Sullivan (2012–2016)
 Elizabeth Spayd (2016–2017)

References

The New York Times
Employees by company